Štěchov is a municipality and village in Blansko District in the South Moravian Region of the Czech Republic. It has about 200 inhabitants.

Administrative parts
The village of Lačnov is an administrative part of Štěchov.

References

Villages in Blansko District